INR or Inr may refer to:

Biology 
 Initiator element, a core promoter in genetics
 International normalized ratio of prothrombin time of blood coagulation
 Interventional neuroradiology, a minimally invasive medical speciality

Organizations 
 Bureau of Intelligence and Research of the U.S. State Department
 Institute of National Remembrance, a Polish research institute
 Institute for Nuclear Research of the Russian Academy of Sciences
 Instituto Nacional de Rehabilitación, a public health institute in Mexico
 , French name of the predecessor (1930–1960) of the Belgian public broadcasting organization RTBF

Other uses 
 Indian rupee, by ISO 4217 currency code
 McKinley National Park Airport, Alaska, USA, FAA identifier
International Railway (New Brunswick) A former rail line in the province of New Brunswick, in Canada